This incomplete list is specifically for Christian music performers in the gospel music genres who have either been very important to the genre, or have had a considerable amount of exposure, such as in the case of one that has been on a major label. This list includes artists that perform in traditional gospel music genres such as Southern gospel, traditional black gospel, urban contemporary gospel, gospel blues, Christian country music, Celtic gospel and British black gospel as well as artists in the general market who have recorded music in these genres. This list is not designed to include performers in the greater Christian music industry specifically contemporary Christian music performers and its subgenres.

Bands are listed by the first letter in their name (not including the words "a", "an", or "the"), and individuals are listed by family name.

Note: Because classifying gospel music can be arbitrary, these groupings are generalized and many artists appear on multiple lists.

A 

 Lee Roy Abernathy
 Jolly Abraham
 Faye Adams
 Oleta Adams
 Yolanda Adams
 Doris Akers
 Alabama Sacred Harp Singers
 Tope Alabi
 Mary Alessi
 Charles McCallon Alexander
 The Rance Allen Group
 Anointed
 The Anointed Pace Sisters
 Inez Andrews
 Vanessa Bell Armstrong

B 

 Annastasia Baker
 Philip Bailey
 Bonny B.
 The Barrett Sisters
 Helen Baylor
 Elder Charles D. Beck
 TY Bello
 The Blackwood Brothers
 The Blind Boys of Alabama
 Dante Bowe
 Irene Bridger
 Anthony Brown & Group Therapy
 Clint Brown
 Nehemiah Hunter Brown
 Anthony Burger
 Kim Burrell
 Myron Butler
 Wanda Nero Butler

C 

 Shirley Caesar
 Byron Cage
 Erica Campbell
 Jesse Campbell
 Lamar Campbell
 Teddy Campbell
 Warryn Campbell
 The Caravans
 Jekalyn Carr
 Kurt Carr
 Isaac Carree
 Casey J
 Johnny Cash
 Alvin Chea
 Mercy Chinwo
 Wayne Christian
 The Clark Sisters
 Mattie Moss Clark
 Elbernita "Twinkie" Clark
 Rev. James Cleveland
 Cheryl "Coko" Clemons
 Tasha Cobbs Leonard
 Dorothy Love Coates
 Sam Cooke
 Dorinda Clark-Cole
 Marcus Cole
 Daryl Coley
 Commissioned
 David L Cook
 The Cook Family Singers
 Zacardi Cortez
 The Crabb Family
 Beverly Crawford
 Latice Crawford
 Andraé Crouch
 Sandra Crouch
 Adlan Cruz

D 
 Montrell Darrett
 Carlene Davis
 Reverend Gary Davis
 The Davis Sisters
 Ricky Dillard
 The Dixie Hummingbirds
 Thomas A. Dorsey
 Holly Dunn
 Bob Dylan
 Don Moen

E 

 Frank Edwards
 Michael English
 Ralna English
 Anthony Evans, Jr.

F 

 Five Blind Boys of Mississippi
 A. C. and Mamie Forehand
 Forever Jones
 James Fortune
 Maxx Frank
 Kirk Franklin (with The Family, God's Property, and INC)
 Aretha Franklin
 Futrel

G 

 Bill Gaither
 Cassietta George
 Lara George
 Geoffrey Golden
 The Golden Gate Quartet
 God's Property
 Jade Trini Goring
 Al Green
 Travis Greene
 Bessie Griffin
 Greater Vision
 Guy & Ralna
 Guvna B

H 

 Ernie Haase
 Damita Haddon
 Deitrick Haddon
 Brother Will Hairston
 Danniebelle Hall
 James Hall
 Marshall Hall
 MC Hammer song on every album including: Family Affair
 Fred Hammond
 Wes Hampton
 Larnelle Harris
 Harvest
 Edwin Hawkins (and the Edwin Hawkins Singers)
 Tramaine Hawkins
 Walter Hawkins
 Cory Henry
 Jake Hess
 Darwin Hobbs
 Danny Hollis
 Dave Hollister
 The Hoppers
 Israel Houghton
 Cissy Houston
 Whitney Houston album: The Preacher's Wife: Original Soundtrack Album
 Guy Hovis
 Norman Hutchins

I 

 The Imperials

J 

 Judy Jacobs
 Alan Jackson
 Mahalia Jackson
 T.D. Jakes
 The Rev. Andrew Jenkins
 Blind Willie Johnson
 Keith "Wonderboy" Johnson
 Le'Andria Johnson
 Bobby Jones
 Canton Jones
 Cheneta Jones
 Mitchell Jones
 Forever Jones
 Jamie Grace

K 

 John P. Kee
 R. Kelly one album: Happy People/U Saved Me
 Tori Kelly
 Ron Kenoly
 Joey Kibble
 Karima Kibble
 Klaudt Indian Family
 Gladys Knight

L 

 Patti LaBelle
 Nikki Laoye
 Donald Lawrence
 Doyle Lawson
 Lowell Lewis
 Bishop Eddie Long
 Dorothy Love Coates
 Patrick Love
 Loretta Lynn
 London Community Gospel Choir

M 

 Luther Magby
 Mali Music
 Rebecca Malope
 Mandisa
 Tamela Mann
 Chris Marion
 Roberta Martin
 Sallie Martin
 Mary Mary
 Brother Joe May
 Reverend Oris Mays
 Donnie McClurkin
 Liz McComb
 Lisa McClendon
 William McDowell
 The McKameys
 Shawn McLemore
 Jonathan McReynolds
 Men of Standard
 Mercy River Boys
 Mighty Clouds of Joy
 Mississippi Mass Choir
 Ericson Alexander Molano
 Chandler Moore 
 Wess Morgan
 Bishop Paul S. Morton, Sr.
 J. Moss
 Nicole C. Mullen
 Martha Munizzi
 Henrie Mutuku

N 

 Jonathan Nelson
 Aaron Neville
 Smokie Norful
 Dorothy Norwood
 Nosa

O 
 Oak Ridge Boys
 Obiwon
 Muyiwa Olarewaju
 One Nation Crew
 Out of Eden

P 

 LaShun Pace
 Sista Monica Parker
 Dolly Parton
 Gary S. Paxton
 Guy Penrod
 Dottie Peoples
 David Phelps
 Washington Phillips
 Wintley Phipps
 Doobie Powell
 Elvis Presley
 Billy Preston
 Charley Pride
 Earnest Pugh
 Lowell Pye
 Planetshakers

Q 

 Qqu

R 

 Lynda Randle
 Jessica Reedy
 Karl Reid
 Little Richard
 Noel Robinson
 Woody Rock
 Thurman Ruth aka Thermon Ruth, T. Ruth

S 

 Samsong
 Papa San
 Ira D. Sankey
 Marvin Sapp
 Briana Scott
 Guy Sebastian
 Marilyn Sellars
 Sensational Nightingales
 Karen Clark Sheard
 Kierra "Kiki" Sheard
 Sinach
 The Soul Stirrers
 Sounds of Blackness
 Singing Christians
 Richard Smallwood
 Micah Stampley
 The Statler Brothers
 The Staple Singers
 Pops Staples
 Mavis Staples
 Keith Staten
 Candi Staton
 Ruben Studdard
 The Swan Silvertones
 Jimmy Swaggart

T 

 Tamela Mann
 Take 6
 Sister Rosetta Tharpe
 Charles Davis Tillman
 Tonéx
 Trin-i-tee 5:7
 Tye Tribbett

V 

 Yolanda Vadiz
 Gary Valenciano
 Táta Vega
 Virtue

W 

 The Wades
 Hezekiah Walker
 Albertina Walker
 Clara Ward
 Mervyn Warren
 Dionne Warwick
 Rosalie "Lady Tamborine" Washington
 Gillian Welch
 Kirk Whalum
 Thomas Whitfield
 Marva Whitney
 Deniece Williams
 Hank Williams
 Lee Williams and the Spiritual QC's
 Marion Williams
 Michelle Williams
 The Williams Brothers
 Doug Williams
 Melvin Williams
 Vanessa Williams
 Anita Wilson
 Brian Courtney Wilson
 Elder Roma Wilson
 The Winans Family
 The Winans
 BeBe & CeCe Winans
 BeBe Winans
 CeCe Winans
 Juan Winans
 Mario Winans
 Marvin Winans
 Pop Winans
 Ron Winans
 Vickie Winans

Y 
 Youthful Praise

See also
 List of Christian vocal artists
 List of Christian worship music artists
 List of country music performers
 List of popular music performers
 List of rock and roll artists

References 

Lists of performers of Christian music
Musicians
Lists of musicians by genre